Peer-led team learning (PLTL) is a model of teaching undergraduate science, math, and engineering courses that introduces peer-led workshops as an integral part of a course. Students who have done well in a course (for instance, General Chemistry) are recruited to become peer-leaders. The peer-leaders meet with small groups of six to ten students each week, for one to two hours, to discuss, debate, and engage in problem solving related to the course material.

History 

PLTL originated at the City College of New York in the early 1990s as part of an effort to address the low success rate of students in General Chemistry.  Peer-led Workshops were incorporated into the teaching of General Chemistry by reducing the amount of lecture to three hours from four hours. Preliminary results at City College of New York and other collaborating institutions indicated improved student attitudes and performance in General Chemistry and other courses. 

These early results led to further study and development of PLTL by a national team, which produced a Guidebook for PLTL. An extensive national dissemination effort resulted in more widespread adoption of essential components of PLTL in a variety of science, mathematics, and engineering coursework. A recent review of research on PLTL and closely related peer-led learning formats found that published studies representing courses at over twenty institutions have demonstrated an average increase of 15% ABC as a fraction of the initially enrolled students, compared to traditional lecture. See for instance key studies in Chemistry, Biology, Computer Science, and Engineering.  The PLTL leadership was recognized by the James Flack Norris Award for Outstanding Achievement in Teaching Chemistry in 2008.

Theory 
PLTL can be understood in the context of cognitive science. It is consistent with social constructivism and ideas of Vygotsky in that students are asked to construct their own understanding with guidance from a more capable peer. They can be said to be learning within the zone of proximal development.

Evaluation of successful implementations of suggest  that PLTL has six critical components: 

 PLTL is integral to the course.
 Peer-leaders are trained in leadership skills.
 Faculty are involved.
 Materials for workshops are challenging and promote collaborative effort.
 Space and noise level acceptable for group discussion and work.
 PLTL is integrated into the institutional structure.

See also
 Peer education
 Peer feedback
 Peer learning
 Peer mentoring
 Peer tutor
 Peer-mediated instruction

References

External links 
 

Peer learning
Undergraduate education in the United States